Deon La velle Thomas (born February 24, 1971) is an American-Israeli former basketball player. As a high school player, he led his team to the Chicago Public League title, and was named Illinois Mr. Basketball.  As a college player at the University of Illinois, he finished his career as the all-time leading scorer in Fighting Illini history. Selected by the Dallas Mavericks with the 28th selection of the 1994 NBA Draft, he opted to play professional basketball in Europe and Israel.

High school career
Thomas was a star basketball player at Chicago's Neal F. Simeon Vocational High School, graduating in 1989. As a junior in 1988, he led the Wolverines to the Chicago Public League title. As a senior, he was named Illinois Mr. Basketball and played in the McDonald's All-American Game, which also featured future NBA star Shaquille O'Neal.

College career
Thomas played college basketball at the University of Illinois.  Thomas finished his career as the all-time leading scorer in Fighting Illini history, with 2,129 career points scored and an 18.0 points per game scoring average.  Thomas is the only men's basketball player in Illinois history to score at least 2,000 career points.  Thomas was elected to the "Illini Men's Basketball All-Century Team" in 2004.

Professional career
Thomas was selected by the Dallas Mavericks with the 28th selection of the 1994 NBA Draft.  Thomas attended mini camp but never played in the NBA, having opted to play professional basketball in Europe and Israel. Thomas played two years in Israel for Maccabi Tel Aviv, winning the Israeli championship, the Israeli cup, and the Euroleague championship twice. Thomas didn't play in the 2005 Final Four due to a  broken leg. This injury forced him to leave Maccabi Tel Aviv. He then joined the Greek team Gymnastikos S. Larissas, the Bulgarian team CSKA Sofia, and then returned to Israel where he played for Givat Shmuel. He then played for Maccabi Haifa, also in Israel.

He is one of the most successful American pros of all time in the European leagues.  Thomas has passed on several opportunities to play in the NBA.  On 13 November 2006, in an interview for Bulgarian newspaper Tema Sport and Bulgarian television "Channel 3", Deon Thomas denied any wrongdoing and swore that he didn't receive anything from University of Illinois, as Bruce Pearl had claimed. He said the decision to play for Illinois was made by his grandmother.

Coaching/Announcing Career
In 2009, Thomas became the men's basketball head coach at Lewis and Clark Community College in Godfrey, Illinois. In April 2014, Thomas was named as an assistant basketball coach at the University of Illinois-Chicago. In 2016, he was hired by Fighting Illini Sports Network to call men's basketball games with Doug Altenberger.

Personal life
Thomas is now an Israeli citizen, and is married to an Israeli.

Honors

High school
 1988 - IHSA 1st Team All-State
 1988 - IHSA State Tournament All-Tournament Team
 1989 - IHSA 1st Team All-State
 1989 - Parade Magazine 1st Team All-American
 1989 - McDonald's All-American
 1989 - Illinois Mr. Basketball
 2015 - Inducted into the Illinois Basketball Coaches Association's Hall of Fame as a player.

College
 1991 - 3rd Team All-Big Ten
 1992 - Illini Team Co-Captain
 1992 - Illini MVP
 1992 - 2nd Team All-Big Ten
 1993 - Illini Team Co-Captain
 1993 - Illini MVP
 1993 - 2nd Team All-Big Ten
 1994 - Illini Team Co-Captain
 1994 - Illini MVP
 1994 - 2nd Team All-Big Ten
 1994 - Honorable Mention All American
 2004 - Elected to the "Illini Men's Basketball All-Century Team".
 2008 - Honored as one of the thirty-three honored jerseys which hang in the State Farm Center to show regard for being the most decorated basketball players in the University of Illinois' history.
 2019 - Inducted into the Illinois Athletics Hall of Fame

College statistics

University of Illinois

* All-time leader in University of Illinois history

References 
http://www.lc.cc.il.us/media/63181/release-deon%20thomas%2009.pdf

External links
 Bruce Pearl's memo to the NCAA
 Deon Thomas' player page at EuroBasket

Living people
1971 births
Liga ACB players
African-American basketball players
American emigrants to Israel
American expatriate basketball people in Bulgaria
American expatriate basketball people in Cyprus
American expatriate basketball people in Greece
American expatriate basketball people in Israel
American expatriate basketball people in Spain
American expatriate basketball people in Turkey
American men's basketball players
Baloncesto Málaga players
Basketball players from Chicago
Bàsquet Manresa players
CB Girona players
CB Gran Canaria players
Real Betis Baloncesto players
Centers (basketball)
Dallas Mavericks draft picks
Gymnastikos S. Larissas B.C. players
Illinois Fighting Illini men's basketball announcers
Illinois Fighting Illini men's basketball players
Israeli American
Israeli men's basketball players
Israeli Basketball Premier League players
Israeli people of African-American descent
Maccabi Givat Shmuel players
Maccabi Haifa B.C. players
Maccabi Rishon LeZion basketball players
Maccabi Tel Aviv B.C. players
McDonald's High School All-Americans
Naturalized citizens of Israel
Parade High School All-Americans (boys' basketball)
Power forwards (basketball)
21st-century African-American sportspeople
20th-century African-American sportspeople